Somatina anthophilata is a moth of the  family Geometridae. It is found in India.

References

Moths described in 1858
Scopulini